Marcin Tarnowski (born 6 February 1985 in Mogilno) is a Polish footballer who plays for Elana Toruń as a forward.

Career 
Tarnowski was born in Mogilno. His career began in Unia Janikowo. In 2002, he moved to Amica Wronki, but usually he played in reserve team. In 2007, he became a player of Jagiellonia Białystok, but he played only two matches there. In 2009 Tarnowski was transferred to Zawisza Bydgoszcz. Since 2011, he is player of Chojniczanka Chojnice (3rd level).

Tarnowski represented Poland while 2002 UEFA European Under-17 Football Championship and 2004 UEFA European Under-19 Football Championship.

References

External links 
 

1985 births
People from Mogilno
Living people
Polish footballers
Unia Janikowo players
Amica Wronki players
Zawisza Bydgoszcz players
Jagiellonia Białystok players
Wigry Suwałki players
Sportspeople from Kuyavian-Pomeranian Voivodeship
Association football forwards